Olaton is an unincorporated community in Ohio County, Kentucky, United States. Olaton had a post office from July 18, 1883, until August 6, 2005; it still has its own ZIP code, 42361.

References

Unincorporated communities in Ohio County, Kentucky
Unincorporated communities in Kentucky